Nawab Sir Sayyid Hassan Ali Mirza Khan Bahadur  (25 August 1846 – 25 December 1906) was the eldest son of  Mansur Ali Khan, the last Nawab of Bengal. He succeeded his father, Mansur Ali Khan, as the first Nawab Bahadur of Murshidabad as the title of Nawab Nazim of Bengal was abolished in 1880. His installation ceremony was performed in the Throne Room of Hazarduari Palace on 27 March 1883 by Sir Rivers Thompson, the Lieutenant-Governor of Bengal. The sanad conferring the hereditary title of Nawab Bahadur of Murshidabad was however dated 17 February 1882. At his death in 1906, he was succeeded by his son, Wasif Ali Mirza.

Early life and education

Sayyid Hassan Ali Mirza was known as Burra Sahib in his childhood and he showed signs of extraordinary intelligence. He was born on 25 August 1846 as the eldest son of Mansur Ali Khan, the last Nawab of Bengal. His mother, Mehr Lekha Begum, was the second wife of his father, and was of Habshi descent.

He received his early lessons in English, Persian and Arabic. He was educated at La Martiniere College in Lucknow. In 1865, he was sent to England to complete his education, where he was accompanied by his younger half brothers, Husain Ali Mirza Bahadur (Mujli Sahib) and Muhammad Ali Mirza Bahadur (Amir Sahib), in company with Colonel Herbert. The young prince was provided with all kinds of amusements. They were kept in a hotel in South Kensington. They also attende the then Prince of Wales, Edward VII's Levée, to which the right of private entry was granted to them. Hassan Ali met Robert Clive's granddaughter, Lady Williams and he received attention from all sides. He was also introduced to Her Majesty Queen Victoria by the state's secretary. They visited many places like Sandgate, Dover Castle, Southsea, Chester, Manchester and so on.  While leaving London in December 1856 they traveled back to Calcutta through France, Italy and Malta, visiting the many famous and reputed cities like Paris, Bologna, Florence, Rome, Naples and so on. Hassan Ali's second foreign visit, rather English visit, was with his father, Mansur Ali Khan in March 1869.

Later years
On 16 February 1887 Hassan Ali was made the Knight Commander of the Order of the Indian Empire and on 28 May 1887 theoriental titles of Ali Kadir (Of First Rank), Ihtisham ul-Mulk (Dignifier of the country), Raes ud-Daulah (Premier of the state), Amir ul-Omrah (Noble of Nobles) and Mahabat Jang (Horror in War) were conferred upon the Nawab. On 20 May 1890 Hassan Ali was made a Knight Grand Commander (GCIE) under a royal warrant, bearing the sign Manual of Her Majesty Queen Victoria. As the, title and post of the Nawab of Bengal was abolished Hassan Ali was appointed to the lesser title of Nawab of Murshidabad (N.B.M.) on 17 February 1882, which was confirmed in this title by the British in the year 1891.

The Nawab died on 25 December 1906 and was buried in Iraq as per his own wish.

Honours
Knight Grand Commander of the Order of the Indian Empire (GCIE)-1890  (KCIE-1887)

Wives and children
Hassan Ali married: 
Amir Dulhan Kulsum un-Nisa Begum Sahiba in 1862 
 Mariam un-Nisa Khanum (Bi Dugari)

Hassan Ali was survived by five sons and two daughters as follows:
 Sayyid Wasif Ali Mirza Bahadur (Bara Sahib) (s/o Amir Dulhan)
 Sayyid Nasir Ali Mirza Bahadur (Nasir Sahib) (s/o Amir Dulhan). He was born on 15 March 1876 at Murshidabad. He was educated at Sherborne School, Dorset, Rugby School, Warwickshire, and Trinity College, Oxford. He married Muhammadi Begum. He died in 1945, having had issue, one son and two daughters.
 Sayyid Asif Ali Mirza Bahadur (Munnah Sahib) (s/o Amir Dulhan). He was born on 26 April 1881 at Murshidabad. He was educated privately. He had a son.
 Sayyid Yakub Ali Mirza Bahadur. He was born on 9 June 1883 at Murshidabad, educated privately. He drowned while bathing on 23 June 1899 at Murshidabad.
 Sayyid Mohsin Ali Mirza Bahadur. he was born at Murshidabad on 18 November 1885.
 Salim un-Nisa Begum (Askari Begum Sahiba) (d/o Mariam un-Nisa Khanum). She married one of her cousins.
 Khurshid un-Nisa Begum (d/o Amir Dulhan). She married Sayyid Zaigham Mirza, son of Sayyid Husain Ali Mirza Bahadur (Wala Qadr), by Bi Begum. She gave birth to one son.

See also
 List of rulers of Bengal
 Nawabs of Bengal and Murshidabad
 History of Bengal
 History of Bangladesh
 History of India

References

External links
  Site dedicated to Hassan Ali

1846 births
1906 deaths
Indian Shia Muslims
Knights Grand Commander of the Order of the Indian Empire
Nawabs of Murshidabad